= Bryce, West Virginia =

Unincorporated community in West Virginia, United States

- Unincorporated community
- Location within West Virginia Location within the United States
- Coordinates: 38°13′23″N 81°9′6″W
- Country: United States
- State: West Virginia
- County: Fayette
- Elevation: 709 ft (216 m)
- Time zone: UTC-5 (Eastern (EST))
  - Summer (DST): UTC-4 (EDT)
- GNIS ID: 1556058

Bryce is an unincorporated community in Fayette County, West Virginia, United States.

The community was named in 1912 by railroad officials.
